The Dwejra Bay to San Dimitri Point Important Bird Area comprises a 36 ha linear strip of cliffed coastline in San Lawrenz and Għarb, at the northwestern end of the island of Gozo, in the Maltese archipelago in the Mediterranean Sea. Its steep and rugged cliffs rise from sea level to a height of 105 m. It was identified as an Important Bird Area (IBA) by BirdLife International because it supports 400–500 breeding pairs of Cory's shearwaters and 30–50 pairs of yelkouan shearwaters.

See also
 List of birds of Malta

References

Seabird colonies
Important Bird Areas of Malta
San Lawrenz
Għarb
Cliffs of Malta